Sonny Allen (March 8, 1936 – September 11, 2020) was an American college basketball coach. He was the head coach at Old Dominion University from 1965 to 1975; leading the Monarchs to six NCAA College/Division II Tournaments, winning in 1975, finishing runner-up in 1971 and finishing fourth in 1976.  He then accepted the Southern Methodist University job, spending the 1975–76 through 1979–80 seasons in Dallas, he then moved to the University of Nevada, Reno from 1980 to 1987.

He was later the head coach for the Sacramento Monarchs of the Women's National Basketball Association (WNBA) from 1999 to 2001. He died of Parkinson's Disease in Reno, Nevada.

References

1936 births
2020 deaths
American men's basketball coaches
American men's basketball players
American women's basketball coaches
Basketball coaches from West Virginia
Basketball players from West Virginia
College men's basketball head coaches in the United States
Continental Basketball Association coaches
Dallas Mavericks assistant coaches
Deaths from Parkinson's disease
Neurological disease deaths in Nevada
Detroit Shock coaches
Marshall Thundering Herd men's basketball coaches
Marshall Thundering Herd men's basketball players
Nevada Wolf Pack men's basketball coaches
Old Dominion Monarchs men's basketball coaches
People from Moundsville, West Virginia
Point guards
Sacramento Monarchs coaches
SMU Mustangs men's basketball coaches